is a 2002 Japanese fantasy suspense film directed by Toshiki Satō and based on the novel Perfect Blue: Kanzen Hentai by Yoshikazu Takeuchi. It was released on August 24, 2002.

Cast
Ayaka Maeda as Ai
Makiko Watanabe
Masahiro Toda
Nao Ōmori
Taro Suwa
Yumi Shimizu

Reception
Jasper Sharp of Midnight Eye wrote that "for the most part Yume Nara Samete is downright boring".

See also
 Perfect Blue (1997), another film based on the same novel

References

External links

2002 fantasy films
Films based on Japanese novels
Films directed by Toshiki Satō
Japanese fantasy films
2000s Japanese-language films
2000s Japanese films